Rangampeta Mandal is one of the 19 mandals in East Godavari District of Andhra Pradesh. As per census 2011, there are 15 villages.

Demographics 
Rangampeta Mandal has total population of 57,106 as per the Census 2011 out of which 28,913 are males while 28,193 are females and the Average Sex Ratio of Rangampeta Mandal is 975. The total literacy rate of Rangampeta Mandal is 58.55%. The male literacy rate is 52.47% and the female literacy rate is 51.8%.

Towns & Villages

Villages 

Doddigunta
Elakolanu
G. Donthamuru
Kotapadu
Marripudi
Mukundavaram
Nallamilli
Pedarayavaram
Rangampeta
Singampalle
South Thirupathi Rajapuram
Subhadrampeta
Vadisaleru
Veerampalem
Venkatapuram

See also 
List of mandals in Andhra Pradesh

References 

Mandals in East Godavari district